Byaduk is a township in the Shire of Southern Grampians in the Western District of Victoria, Australia.
European settlement began around 1853 by Wendish or Sorbian
Lutheran immigrants who gave it the name Neukirch after the town in Saxony.

The township was settled in the early 1860s, and named Byaduk, an aboriginal word apparently meaning "stone tomahawk". The Post Office opened on 1 August 1863.

Tourism
The Byaduk Caves, lava tubes from the volcanic eruption of Mount Napier, are nearby.  You can also see extensive views of the lava flow at Harmans Valley and the tumuli lava blisters off Old Crushers Road.

Famous residents 
Sergeant Simon Fraser, 57th Battalion, (a farmer from Byaduk) is honoured by a 1998 sculpture by Peter Corlett in the Australian Memorial Park in Fromelles, France and a 2008 replica at the Shrine of Remembrance in Melbourne depicting him 
rescuing a wounded compatriot from no man's land after the Battle of Fromelles in 1916.

References

External links 

Video of VC Corner and Australian Memorial Park, Fromelles. Jason Fielding

Towns in Victoria (Australia)